Tímea Babos and Kimiko Date-Krumm were the defending champions, but chose not to participate together.  Babos played alongside Olga Govortsova, while Date-Krumm teamed up with Karolína Plíšková.  The two teams were scheduled to meet in the semifinals, but Date-Krumm withdrew with a right leg injury.

Darija Jurak and Megan Moulton-Levy won the title, defeating Babos and Govortsova in the final, 7–6(7–5), 3–6, [11–9].

Seeds

Draw

Draw

References
 Main Draw

Monterrey Open - Doubles
2014 Doubles